REOL Productions Corporation was a film production company in New York City from 1921 until 1924 during the silent film era. It released ten films for African American audiences. The company promoted its films by noting they were adaptations of works by African American authors such as a film version of Paul Laurence Dunbar's 1902 novel The Sport of the Gods. Lafayette Theatre manager Robert Levy (producer) managed the film productions with casts from the Lafayette Players.

The studio's first release was The Sport of the Gods.

The company's The Call of His People was an adaptation of Audrey Bowser's book about passing The Man Who Would Be White. Plans developed to adapt Charles W. Chesnutt's The Marrow of Tradition but did not come to fruition. The film company went out of business in 1924.

Productions included melodramas, at least one comedy, and two documentaries. It secured a distribution agreement in Philadelphia and Baltimore.

In 2002, the Cornell Institute for Digital Collections sought out any holders of the company's films for a restoration and preservation project.

The Simp
The Simp featured Sherman H. Dudley Jr, Inez Clough, Edna Morton, Alex K. Shannon, and Percy Verwayen.

Filmography
The Sport of the Gods (film) (1921)
The Burden of Race (1921)
The Secret Sorrow, starring George Edward Brown
The Call of His People (1922), an adaptation of Aubrey Bowser's The Man Who would Be White.
The Jazz Hounds
The Simp (1921)
Ties of Blood (1921)
The Schemers (1922) 
Easy Money (1922)
Spitfire (1922)

References

See also
Foster Photoplay Company

Defunct companies based in New York City
Defunct American film studios
African-American cinema
1921 establishments in New York City
1924 disestablishments in New York (state)
American companies disestablished in 1924
American companies established in 1921